Lim Chang-min (born August 25, 1985) is a South Korean professional baseball pitcher for the Kiwoom Heroes of the KBO League.

References

External links
Career statistics and player information from Korea Baseball Organization

1985 births
Living people
Sportspeople from Gwangju
Kiwoom Heroes players
NC Dinos players
Doosan Bears players
KBO League pitchers
South Korean baseball players
Yonsei University alumni
2015 WBSC Premier12 players
2017 World Baseball Classic players